Kystatyam (Kıstatıam) is a rural locality (a selo), the only inhabited locality, and the administrative center of Lensky Rural Okrug of Zhigansky District in the Sakha Republic, Russia, located  from Zhigansk, the administrative center of the district. Its population as of the 2010 Census was 397, down from 453 recorded during the 2002 Census.

References

Notes

Sources
Official website of the Sakha Republic. Registry of the Administrative-Territorial Divisions of the Sakha Republic. Zhigansky District. 

Rural localities in Zhigansky District
Populated places on the Lena River